De Beauvoir  is a ward encompassing De Beauvoir Town in the London Borough of Hackney and forms part of the Hackney South and Shoreditch constituency. The ward has existed since the creation of the borough on 1 April 1965 and was first used in the 1964 elections. The boundaries of the ward from May 2014 are revised.

1965–1978
De Beauvoir ward has existed since the creation of the London Borough of Hackney on 1 April 1965. It was first used in the 1964 elections, with an electorate of 7,678, returning two councillors.

1978–2002
There was a revision of ward boundaries in Hackney in 1978.

2002–2014
The ward returns two councillors to Hackney Council, with an election every four years. At the last election on 22 May 2014, James Peters and Laura Bunt, Labour Party candidates, were returned. Turnout was 38.65%; with 5,458 votes cast.

In 2011, De Beauvoir ward had a total population of 8,494 people. This compares with the average ward population within the borough of 10,674.

References

External links
 London Borough of Hackney list of constituencies and councillors.
 What's Happening in De Beauvoir - Local councillor blog
 Labour Party profile of Rob Chapman
 Labour Party profile of Gulay Icoz

Wards of the London Borough of Hackney